Harpyionycteris is a genus of megabat in the family Pteropodidae. It contains the following species:

Genus Harpyionycteris
 Harpy fruit bat, Harpyionycteris whiteheadi
 Sulawesi harpy fruit bat, Harpyionycteris celebensis

References

 
Bat genera
Taxa named by Oldfield Thomas
Taxonomy articles created by Polbot